The 2020 Stanley Cup playoffs was the playoff tournament of the National Hockey League (NHL). The playoffs began on August 1, 2020, and concluded on September 28, 2020, with the Tampa Bay Lightning winning their second Stanley Cup in franchise history, defeating the Dallas Stars four games to two in the Stanley Cup Finals. The playoffs were originally scheduled to begin in April, a few days after the 2019–20 regular season, and end in June. However, on March 12, the regular season was suspended due to the COVID-19 pandemic.

On May 26, commissioner Gary Bettman confirmed that the league was going to use a 24-team playoff format to finish the season, conducted in two or more host cities as "hubs" with players placed under strict health protocols, quarantined from the general public, and all games played behind closed doors with no fans admitted. On July 10, the league ratified an agreement for its protocols with the NHL Players Association (NHLPA). The Eastern Conference played its early-round games at Scotiabank Arena in Toronto, while the early rounds for the Western Conference, as well as the Conference Finals and Stanley Cup Finals, were played at Rogers Place in Edmonton. This was the first Stanley Cup playoffs to be contested entirely in Canada since 1925, as well as the first time that the Stanley Cup was awarded on Canadian soil since 2011.

The Boston Bruins made the playoffs as the Presidents' Trophy winners with the most points (i.e. best record) during the regular season. The Pittsburgh Penguins increased their postseason appearance streak to fourteen seasons, the longest active streak. For the first time since 1996, all California-based teams, the Anaheim Ducks, Los Angeles Kings, and San Jose Sharks, missed the playoffs. Six Canadian-based teams made the postseason this year, the most since 1993. It also marked the first time since 1986 that all four teams in cities based in Western Canada made the playoffs. In addition, it marked the first time that both the Winnipeg Jets and Arizona Coyotes (previously the original Jets, before relocation) qualified for the playoffs in the same season, as well as the first time that the Coyotes made the playoffs since 2012. For the first time since 1999, all former World Hockey Association teams (Edmonton Oilers, Arizona Coyotes, Carolina Hurricanes, and Colorado Avalanche) made the playoffs.

Game two of the Second Round series between the Vancouver Canucks and Vegas Golden Knights was the 94th game of the 2020 Stanley Cup playoffs, surpassing the previous single-year record of 93 established in 2014. On September 17, the Tampa Bay Lightning became the first team in NHL history to win the clinching game of their first three series in overtime. The Dallas Stars set the record for the most games played in one playoff year (27) in game six of the Stanley Cup Finals; the previous record (26) was shared by the 1987 Philadelphia Flyers, 2004 Calgary Flames, 2014 Los Angeles Kings, 2015 Tampa Bay Lightning and 2019 St. Louis Blues. Game six of the Stanley Cup Finals was also the 130th game of the playoffs, setting the all-time record for most games played in one playoff year.

All games that were originally scheduled on August 27 and 28 were postponed due to a wildcat strike, in response to the shooting of Jacob Blake in Kenosha, Wisconsin.

Playoff format

On May 26, the league announced that 24 teams (12 per conference) advanced to this special conference-based playoff tournament with teams being seeded based on their points percentage at the time the regular season was suspended on March 12. The top four teams in each conference played in a separate seeding round-robin to determine the seeding in the first round. These games were played with regular season overtime and shootout rules, with the clubs accumulating points like the regular season, and any ties in the Round-robin standings were broken by the regular season points percentage. The eight lower seeded teams in each conference played in the Qualifying Round, a best-of-five series with playoff overtime rules. The winners of these series advanced to face one of the Round-Robin teams in the First Round.

On May 28, the NHL stated that both the Round-robin and the Qualifying Round were to be counted under playoff records, on the same day that the league declared the winners of the stats-based regular-season NHL awards. The league then announced on June 4 that all series after the Qualifying Round would remain a best-of-seven series but were re-seeded after each round. With the ratification of an extension to the collective bargaining agreement on July 10, the league also announced that all teams participating in the qualifying round are considered to have made the playoffs and have participated in a playoff series.

Host cities
The playoffs were held in two "hub" cities both in Canada; Edmonton, Alberta at Rogers Place, and Toronto, Ontario at Scotiabank Arena. They were announced as host cities on July 10 with the NHLPA's ratification of the Return to Play plan, and an extension to its collective bargaining agreement with the NHLPA through the 2025–26 season. From the start of the playoffs through to the end of the Second Round, each city hosted all of the games for one conference: the Eastern Conference teams played in Toronto, and the Western Conference teams played in Edmonton. All games in the Conference Finals and Stanley Cup Finals were played in Edmonton.

Edmonton and Toronto were among a shortlist of ten host cities announced on May 26, along with Chicago, Columbus, Dallas, Las Vegas, Los Angeles, Pittsburgh, Saint Paul, and Vancouver. After the league cut the shortlist down to six cities on June 22, Las Vegas and Vancouver were considered to be the frontrunners to host games. Shortly after this, Vancouver dropped out of consideration on June 25, after health officials in British Columbia were unable to agree with the league on a protocol in the event that a player tested positive for COVID-19. Las Vegas and the other U.S. cities were passed over after Nevada and other U.S. states began to experience a spike in COVID-19 cases in late June; it was reported that the NHL originally intended to have one host city in Canada and one in the United States.

Each group of teams played inside what was called a "bubble". A secure perimeter was constructed around both venues with various amenities, with Edmonton's covering four hotels in the Ice District and Rogers Place's existing practice facilities, and Toronto's split between Exhibition Place (Hotel X, BMO Field, & Coca-Cola Coliseum) and the Fairmont Royal York hotel (which is connected to Scotiabank Arena). Both sites included fitness, dining and recreation areas. Restaurants were operating within the secure zones, and players were able to order outside food via concierge and local food delivery services. The games were held behind closed doors, but non-participating players were allowed to watch games. A large "stage" with multiple video screens was constructed to cover the empty stands for both teams in each end of the arena, and in-arena presentation was customized for each team when they were the designated home team (including use of their goal music, among other features). The league implemented a compressed playoff schedule with more back-to-back games than usual to help address "bubble fatigue" among the players, who had to live with monotonous daily routines away from their families for several weeks.

Although the general public was not permitted within the direct vicinity of the arena or inside, Oilers Entertainment Group announced plans to set up an outdoor "FanFest" at the site of a former casino near Rogers Place with approval of municipal and provincial health officials, including a "drive-in" screening games and a beer garden.

Medical protocols
Under the Return to Play plan that was ratified on July 10, any player could opt out of the restart without providing a reason and without any penalty, provided that they had informed their team by July 13, when formal training camps opened. COVID-19 tests were then to be administered to players and staff every other day. On July 19, testing increased to three times 48 hours apart. The identities of those who tested positive were not released to the public, they would then be isolated and designated with the generic description "unfit for play" until they were medically cleared, and all injury updates were handled by the league instead of the teams.

Teams arrived at their hub city on July 26; they were isolated in a "secure zone" consisting of their hotels, restaurants, practice facilities, and the arena. Testing was done every day, as well as daily temperature and symptom checks. Individuals had to wear masks outside their hotel rooms except when eating, exercising, or while on the ice or bench. Other exceptions included during interviews with appropriate social distancing.

Under the Quarantine Act, all travellers entering Canada at the time were required to self-isolate for 14 days on arrival. The NHL received an exception to this policy for its players and staff, as long as they remained within the secure zone and were restricted from access to or by the general public. Anybody who left the bubble without prior approval could have faced a mandatory 14-day quarantine or been barred from returning. Teams could have also faced fines or loss of draft picks.

During the conclusions of each Qualifying Round series, teams exchanged fist bumps instead of the traditional handshakes. As players and coaches continued to test negative for COVID-19, the traditional handshake lines returned at the end of each first-round series. After entering the bubble, the league had no personnel test positive for the virus during the playoffs.

Playoff teams
The following teams qualified for the playoffs:

Eastern Conference
Seeding Round-robin
 Boston Bruins, Atlantic Division champions, Eastern Conference regular season champions, Presidents' Trophy winners – .714
 Tampa Bay Lightning – .657
 Washington Capitals, Metropolitan Division champions – .652
 Philadelphia Flyers – .645

Qualifying Round
Pittsburgh Penguins – .623 
Carolina Hurricanes – .596 
New York Islanders – .588 
Toronto Maple Leafs – .579 (28 ) 
Columbus Blue Jackets – .579 (25 ) 
Florida Panthers – .565 
New York Rangers – .564 
Montreal Canadiens – .500

Western Conference
Seeding Round-robin
 St. Louis Blues, Central Division champions, Western Conference regular season champions – .662
 Colorado Avalanche – .657
 Vegas Golden Knights, Pacific Division champions – .606
 Dallas Stars – .594

Qualifying Round
Edmonton Oilers – .585 
Nashville Predators – .565 (28 ) 
Vancouver Canucks – .565 (27 ) 
Calgary Flames – .564 
Winnipeg Jets – .563 
Minnesota Wild – .558 
Arizona Coyotes – .529 
Chicago Blackhawks – .514

Playoff bracket
In each round, the highest remaining seed in each conference is matched against the lowest remaining seed. The higher-seeded team is awarded home ice advantage. In the Stanley Cup Finals, home ice was determined based on regular season points percentage. Each best-of-five series followed a 2–2–1 format: the higher-seeded team was the designated as the host for games one and two (and game five, if necessary), and the lower-seeded team was the host for games three (and game four, if necessary). Each best-of-seven series followed a 2–2–1–1–1 format: the higher-seeded team was the host for games one and two (and games five and seven, if necessary), and the lower-seeded team was the host for games three and four (and game six, if necessary). In the First Round, the top four teams in each conference were seeded one through four based on their final standings from the Round-robin. The teams that advanced from the Qualifying Round were re-seeded five through eight based on their regular season points percentage.

Exhibition games
Prior to the start of the playoffs, all 24 qualified teams played one exhibition game.

July 28

July 29

July 30

Stanley Cup Qualifiers

The top four playoff teams in each conference played in a round-robin tournament against each other to determine the final playoff seeding. The round-robin games were played with regular season overtime and shootout rules, with the teams accumulating points like the regular season, and any ties in the round-robin standings were broken by the regular-season points percentage instead of regulation wins.

The bottom eight playoff teams in each conference played in a best-of-five series to determine which four teams advanced to the first round. The qualifying round games were played with Stanley Cup playoff overtime rules. Seeding was determined by regular season points percentage.

Eastern Conference seeding round-robin

During the first game of round-robin play, the Flyers' Carter Hart made 34 saves against the Bruins in a 4–1 victory. In the game between Washington and Tampa Bay, with the game forced to go to a shootout (the first in Stanley Cup playoff history), Nikita Kucherov's shot got past Braden Holtby for the winning goal in a 3–2 triumph. The Lightning then faced the Bruins, and Tyler Johnson's goal at 18:33 of the third period won the game for Tampa Bay 3–2. In the Flyers' match-up against the Capitals, Scott Laughton's two goals assisted Philadelphia's 3–1 victory. Between the top two seeds, the Flyers defeated the Lightning 4–1 to take the first seed riding on Nicolas Aube-Kubel's two goals in the first period. Battling out for the third spot, Holtby made 30 saves for Washington in their victory, defeating the Presidents' Trophy-winning Boston Bruins 2–1.

Western Conference seeding round-robin

During the first game between Colorado and St. Louis, Nazem Kadri scored with 0.1 remaining on the clock for the Avalanche emerging victorious 2–1. Vegas staged a two-goal comeback in their game against Dallas, coming back from 3–1 down to win 5–3. Avalanche goalie Pavel Francouz shut out the Stars 4–0 taking a 2–0 record in the Round-robin. Vegas forward Alex Tuch and defenceman Shea Theodore both scored twice in their game against St. Louis, emerging victorious 6–4. Battling out for the first seed, the Avalanche and Golden Knights held a back-and-forth affair until Alex Tuch scored in overtime to give Vegas a 4–3 victory, emerging as the top seed in the Western Conference. The Round-robin finale between the Stars and Blues was to determine the third seed. Joe Pavelski tied the game at one for the Stars with only 32 seconds remaining in regulation, then Denis Gurianov scored the only goal of the shootout to give Dallas the third seed with the 2–1 victory.

Eastern Conference Qualifying Round

(5) Pittsburgh Penguins vs. (12) Montreal Canadiens
Pittsburgh finished fifth in the Eastern Conference with 86 points in 69 games for a points percentage of .623. Montreal gained 71 points in 71 games for a points percentage of .500 to finish twelfth in the Eastern Conference. This was the third playoff meeting between these two teams, with Montreal winning both previous series. They last met in the 2010 Eastern Conference Semifinals, which Montreal won in seven games. Pittsburgh won two of the three games in this year's regular season series.

The Canadiens upset the Penguins in four games. With game one remaining tied 2–2 after the third period, Jeff Petry scored in overtime to give the Canadiens the victory. Among the 38 shots the Penguins forced on Carey Price in game two, Pittsburgh forward Jason Zucker's goal in the third period was the game-winner in their 3–1 triumph. In game three, Jeff Petry's goal in the third period capped a two-goal comeback for Montreal winning the affair 4–3 and taking the series lead. In game four, Carey Price shut the Penguins out 2–0 advancing the team to the First Round of the playoffs.

(6) Carolina Hurricanes vs. (11) New York Rangers
Carolina finished sixth in the Eastern Conference with 81 points in 68 games for a points percentage of .596. New York gained 79 points in 70 games for a points percentage of .564 to finish eleventh in the Eastern Conference. This was the first playoff meeting between these two teams. New York won all four games in this year's regular season series.

The Hurricanes defeated the Rangers in a three-game sweep. In game one, Sebastian Aho and Jaccob Slavin both recorded a goal and an assist in the Hurricanes 3–2 victory. Andrei Svechnikov scored the Hurricanes' first playoff hat trick during game two in a 4–1 victory, giving Carolina the chance to clinch in game three. Aho provided two goals and an assist in game three giving Carolina a 4–1 victory and advancing the team to the First Round of the playoffs.

(7) New York Islanders vs. (10) Florida Panthers
New York finished seventh in the Eastern Conference with 80 points in 68 games for a points percentage of .588. Florida gained 78 points in 69 games for a points percentage of .565 to finish tenth in the Eastern Conference. This was the second playoff meeting between these two teams. Their only previous meeting was in the 2016 Eastern Conference first round, which New York won in six games. New York won all three games in this year's regular season series.

The Islanders defeated the Panthers in four games. In game one, a 27-save performance by New York goalie Semyon Varlamov gave the Islanders a 2–1 victory. Game two had Jordan Eberle score two goals for the Islanders, leading the team to a 4–2 victory. The Panthers, in danger of elimination in game three, scored two power-play goals en route to a 3–2 victory to force a fourth game. In the fourth game, Anthony Beauvillier scored twice for New York to send the Islanders to the First Round of the playoffs in a 5–1 victory.

(8) Toronto Maple Leafs vs. (9) Columbus Blue Jackets
Toronto finished eighth in the Eastern Conference with 81 points in 70 games for a points percentage of .579 and 28 . Columbus had the same points percentage, but with 25  they finished ninth. This was the first playoff meeting between these two teams. These teams split their two-game regular season series.

The Blue Jackets defeated the Maple Leafs in five games. Joonas Korpisalo shut out the Maple Leafs in game one, stopping all 28 shots in a 2–0 victory. Maple Leafs goalie Frederik Andersen responded with his own shut out in game two, stopping 20 shots in the process of a 3–0 victory. Pierre-Luc Dubois's hat-trick, three-goal comeback-fulfilling, overtime goal spurred Columbus' game three victory, winning by a score of 4–3. The Maple Leafs then responded with their own three-goal comeback, all while sporting an extra attacker with the goalie pulled. Auston Matthews then scored the overtime game-winner, the Leafs were victorious by a score of 4–3. In game five, Korpisalo shut the door on the Leafs, stopping all 33 shots in a 3–0 victory to advance to the First Round of the playoffs.

Western Conference Qualifying Round

(5) Edmonton Oilers vs. (12) Chicago Blackhawks
Edmonton finished fifth in the Western Conference with 83 points in 71 games for a points percentage of .585. Chicago gained 72 points in 70 games for a points percentage of .514 to finish twelfth in the Western Conference. This was the fifth playoff meeting between these two teams, with Edmonton winning three of the four previous series. They last met in the 1992 Clarence Campbell Conference Final, which Chicago won in a four-game sweep. Chicago won two of the three games in this year's regular season series.

The Blackhawks upset the Oilers in four games. Blackhawks rookie forward Dominik Kubalik scored two goals and assisted three times in game one, resulting in Chicago's 6–4 victory. In game two, Oilers captain Connor McDavid recorded a hat-trick assisted thrice by Ryan Nugent-Hopkins tying the series 1–1 in a 6–3 triumph. In game three, Blackhawks captain Jonathan Toews scored twice, including the game-winner with 1:16 remaining in the game, capping off a 4–3 victory. In game four, Kubalik's goal at 8:30 of the third period proved to be the series-winner, defeating the Oilers 3–2.

(6) Nashville Predators vs. (11) Arizona Coyotes
Nashville finished sixth in the Western Conference with 78 points in 69 games for a points percentage of .565, winning the tiebreaker against Vancouver with 28 . Arizona gained 74 points in 70 games for a points percentage of .529 to finish eleventh in the Western Conference. This was the second playoff meeting between these two teams. Their only previous meeting was in the 2012 Western Conference Semifinals, which Arizona won in five games. These teams split their two-game regular season series.

The Coyotes defeated the Predators in four games. In game one, the Coyotes jumped out to a 4–1 lead, scoring a power play and a shorthanded goal, and held off a Predators third period rally for the victory. Although the Coyotes had two goals in the final minute of game two, the Predators successfully kept the lead winning 4–2. In game three, Darcy Kuemper stopped 39 of 40 shots and his teammates exploded for three goals in the third period, leading to a 4–1 victory. The Coyotes clinched in game four after much drama; they blew a 2–0 second period lead and allowed Filip Forsberg's tying goal with only 32 seconds left in regulation, but Brad Richardson scored the series-winner 5:27 into overtime.

(7) Vancouver Canucks vs. (10) Minnesota Wild
Vancouver finished seventh in the Western Conference with 78 points in 69 games for a points percentage of .565, losing the tiebreaker against Nashville with 27 . Minnesota gained 77 points in 69 games for a points percentage of .558 to finish tenth in the Western Conference. This was the second playoff meeting between these two teams. Their only previous meeting was in the 2003 Western Conference Semifinals, which Minnesota came back from a 3–1 series deficit to win in seven games. Minnesota won two of the three games in this year's regular season series.

The Canucks defeated the Wild in four games. Alex Stalock stopped all 28 shots he faced in Minnesota's game one victory; the Wild won 3–0. In game two, Bo Horvat and Alexander Edler both had a goal and an assist to help Vancouver even the series 1–1 winning the contest 4–3. Quinn Hughes assisted on all three goals and Jacob Markstrom stopped all 27 shots for Vancouver's game three victory. In game four, the Canucks' Christopher Tanev provided two assists and the series-winning overtime goal to send Vancouver to the First Round of the playoffs. Tanev's goal at eleven seconds into overtime tied the second fastest playoff overtime goal.

(8) Calgary Flames vs. (9) Winnipeg Jets
Calgary finished eighth in the Western Conference with 79 points in 70 games for a points percentage of .564. Winnipeg gained 80 points in 71 games for a points percentage of .563 to finish ninth in the Western Conference. This was the first playoff meeting between these two teams. This was also the first Stanley Cup playoff meeting between these two cities since the 1987 Smythe Division Semifinals. Winnipeg won the only game in this year's regular season series, which was played outdoors.

The Flames defeated the Jets in four games. In game one, the Flames scored a power-play goal, then a short-handed goal, followed by another power-play goal in the second period to take a 4–1 victory. The Jets tied the series 1–1 on Connor Hellebuyck's 28-save performance in a 3–2 victory. In game three, Sean Monahan scored a goal and assisted twice in the Flames' 6–2 victory, giving his team a chance to advance in game four. Cam Talbot led the Flames to the series victory in game four, shutting the Jets out by a score of 4–0, stopping all 31 shots in the process.

First Round
Note: Teams seeded 1–4 in each conference were based on their final standings from the Round-robin. All teams advancing from the Qualifying Round were re-seeded 5–8 based on their regular season points percentage.

Eastern Conference First Round

(1) Philadelphia Flyers vs. (8) Montreal Canadiens
Philadelphia earned the first seed in the Eastern Conference after finishing 3–0 in the round-robin; during the regular season they finished with 89 points in 69 games for a .645 points percentage. Montreal earned the eighth seed in the Eastern Conference as the lowest advancing seed from the Qualifying Round by defeating Pittsburgh. This was the seventh playoff meeting between these two teams with both teams splitting the six previous series. They last met in the 2010 Eastern Conference Final, which Philadelphia won in five games. Philadelphia won two of the three games in this year's regular season series.

The Flyers eliminated the Canadiens in six games. In game one, Carter Hart made 27 saves against the Canadiens, defeating Montreal 2–1. Prior to game two, Canadiens head coach Claude Julien left the bubble due to an emergency stent being placed in his coronary artery. Kirk Muller was named interim head coach for the remainder of the series while Julien recovered in Montreal. Montreal tied the series after game two on Tomas Tatar and Jesperi Kotkaniemi two goals and Carey Price's 30-save 5–0 shut out victory. In game three, Flyers forward Jakub Voracek scored the only goal of the game and Hart turned away all 23 shots in a 1–0 shutout. Hart continued his shutout into game four, stopping all 29 shots in a 2–0 victory. In game five, Joel Armia scored twice for the Canadiens forcing a sixth game after 5–3 victory. Kevin Hayes had a goal and an assist in game six for the Flyers who defeated the Canadiens 3–2 and advanced to the Second Round.

(2) Tampa Bay Lightning vs. (7) Columbus Blue Jackets
Tampa Bay earned the second seed in the Eastern Conference after finishing 2–1 in the round-robin; during the regular season they finished with 92 points in 70 games for a .657 points percentage. Columbus earned the seventh seed in the Eastern Conference as the second lowest advancing seed from the Qualifying Round by defeating Toronto. This was the second consecutive playoff meeting and second postseason match-up between these two teams. Columbus won last year's Eastern Conference First Round playoff meeting in a four-game sweep. Tampa Bay won the only game in this year's regular season series.

The Lightning defeated the Blue Jackets in five games. In game one, with the match tied at two, the teams headed into overtime. At 10:27 of the fifth overtime, Lightning forward Brayden Point ended the 3–2 marathon nearly six hours after its start. It was the fourth-longest game in NHL history. Columbus goalie Joonas Korpisalo made 85 saves during the affair, setting a modern day NHL record for saves in a playoff game. The Blue Jackets tied the series on Pierre-Luc Dubois's two assists and Korpisalo's 36 saves in game two, winning 3–1. In game three, Point continued his point streak scoring the second goal of a 3–2 Lightning victory. Barclay Goodrow and Yanni Gourde both scored and provided an assist for the Lightning in game four, who defeated the Blue Jackets 2–1 and took a 3–1 series lead. In game five, the Blue Jackets overcame a two-goal deficit to take the lead 4–2, however the Lightning were able to tie the score with 1:38 remaining in the game, which required overtime again. At 5:12 of the first overtime, Point's backhanded shot over Korpisalo ended the series, avenging last year's series for the Lightning, and sending them to the Second Round.

(3) Washington Capitals vs. (6) New York Islanders
Washington earned the third seed in the Eastern Conference after finishing 1–2 in the round-robin; during the regular season they finished with 90 points in 69 games for a .652 points percentage. New York earned the sixth seed in the Eastern Conference as the second highest advancing seed from the Qualifying Round by defeating Florida. This was the eighth playoff meeting between these two teams with New York winning five of the seven previous series. They last met in the 2015 Eastern Conference First Round, which Washington won in seven games. These teams split the four games in this year's regular season series.

The Islanders defeated the Capitals in five games. In game one, Josh Bailey's short-handed goal at 6:52 of the third period put the Islanders ahead 3–2 and with Anthony Beauvillier's goal to make it 4–2 New York held onto their lead to take the victory. Jean-Gabriel Pageau's two assists helped the Islanders take game two 5–2 taking a 2–0 series lead. The Islanders took a 3–0 series lead after game three ended in overtime on Mathew Barzal's goal, giving New York a 2–1 victory. In game four, Alexander Ovechkin's two goals extended the series for the Capitals in a 3–2 victory. Beauvillier's two goals helped shut the door against the Capitals, defeating them 4–0 and advancing to Second Round.

(4) Boston Bruins vs. (5) Carolina Hurricanes
Boston earned the fourth seed in the Eastern Conference after finishing 0–3 in the round-robin; during the regular season they finished with 100 points in 70 games for a .714 points percentage. Carolina earned the fifth seed in the Eastern Conference as the highest advancing seed from the Qualifying Round by defeating the New York Rangers. This was the second consecutive postseason match-up and sixth playoff meeting overall between these two teams; with Boston winning four of the five previous series. Boston won last year's Eastern Conference Final series in a four-game sweep. Boston won the only game in this year's regular season series.

The Bruins defeated the Hurricanes in five games. Due to game one of the Blue Jackets–Lightning series extending to the fifth overtime, game one of this series was postponed to the next day. The Bruins and Hurricanes had their own overtime marathon in game one with the game tied at three, but the game ended at 1:13 of the second overtime with Patrice Bergeron's goal. In game two, Martin Necas assisted twice for the Hurricanes who defeated the Bruins 3–2. With Tuukka Rask opting to leave the bubble, Jaroslav Halak started game three for the Bruins during which he made 29 saves, defeating the Hurricanes for a 3–1 victory. In game four, the Bruins came back from a 2–0 deficit, scoring four goals in the third period to overtake the Hurricanes by a final score of 4–3. In game five, David Pastrnak assisted twice in a defensive match defeating the Hurricanes 2–1 and advancing to the Second Round.

Western Conference First Round

(1) Vegas Golden Knights vs. (8) Chicago Blackhawks
Vegas earned the first seed in the Western Conference after finishing 3–0 in the round-robin; during the regular season they finished with 86 points in 71 games for a .606 points percentage. Chicago earned the eighth seed in the Western Conference as the lowest advancing seed from the Qualifying Round by defeating Edmonton. This was the first playoff meeting between these two teams. Vegas won two of the three games in this year's regular season series.

The Golden Knights defeated the Blackhawks in five games. In game one, Reilly Smith scored twice and provided an assist for the Golden Knights' 4–1 victory. Smith then ended game two at 7:13 of the first overtime; his team was victorious by a score of 4–3. In game three, the Golden Knights continued their win streak, defeating the Blackhawks 2–1 on Marc-Andre Fleury's 26 saves. Chicago ended Vegas' win streak in game four, riding on Corey Crawford's 48 saves performance to defeat the Golden Knights 3–1. In game five, Alex Tuch scored the go-ahead goal to put Vegas ahead in the third period. From there, they played defensively, turning away seven shots to win 4–3 and advance to the Second Round of the playoffs.

(2) Colorado Avalanche vs. (7) Arizona Coyotes
Colorado earned the second seed in the Western Conference after finishing 2–1 in the round-robin; during the regular season they finished with 92 points in 70 games for a .657 points percentage. Arizona earned the seventh seed in the Western Conference as the second lowest advancing seed from the Qualifying Round by defeating Nashville. This was the second playoff meeting between these two teams. Their only previous meeting was in the 2000 Western Conference Quarterfinals, which Colorado won in five games. These teams split their two-game regular season series.

The Avalanche defeated the Coyotes in five games. The Avalanche limited the Coyotes to fourteen shots in game one and Philipp Grubauer stopped all of them in their 3–0 victory. In game two, Avalanche right wing Andre Burakovsky scored the game-winning goal with 2:53 remaining in the third period to defeat the Coyotes 3–2. Darcy Kuemper made 49 saves in game three, giving the Coyotes a 4–2 victory and their first win of the series. The Avalanche provided a defensive and offensive approach to game four routing out the Coyotes 7–1 and limiting their shots to 15 giving them a chance to clinch in game five. In game five, the Avalanche continued their dominance in a 7–1 victory, advancing to the Second Round on Nathan MacKinnon's two goals and two assists.

(3) Dallas Stars vs. (6) Calgary Flames
Dallas earned the third seed in the Western Conference after finishing 1–2 in the round-robin; during the regular season they finished with 82 points in 69 games for a .594 points percentage. Calgary earned the sixth seed in the Western Conference as the second highest advancing seed from the Qualifying Round by defeating Winnipeg. This was the second playoff meeting between these two teams. Their only previous meeting was in the 1981 Stanley Cup Semifinals, which the then-Minnesota North Stars won in six games. Calgary won two of the three games in this year's regular season series.

The Stars eliminated the Flames in six games. Dillon Dube scored twice for Calgary in game one as the Flames took the victory 3–2. In game two, with forty seconds remaining, Jamie Oleksiak scored the game-winning goal for Dallas defeating Calgary 5–4. Cam Talbot stopped all 35 shots he faced in game three defeating the Stars 2–0 and taking a 2–1 series lead. In game four, Stars forward Joe Pavelski scored a hat trick and Alexander Radulov's overtime-game winner tied the series 2–2, defeating the Flames 5–4. Anton Khudobin made 28 saves for the Stars in game five, defeating the Flames 2–1 and taking a 3–2 series lead. In game six, the Stars recovered from a 3–0 deficit led by Denis Gurianov's four goals, completing the series with a 7–3 victory.

(4) St. Louis Blues vs. (5) Vancouver Canucks
St. Louis earned the fourth seed in the Western Conference after finishing 0–3 in the round-robin; during the regular season they finished with 94 points in 71 games for a .662 points percentage. Vancouver earned the fifth seed in the Western Conference as the highest advancing seed from the Qualifying Round by defeating Minnesota. This was the fourth playoff meeting between these two teams, with Vancouver winning all three previous series. They last met in the 2009 Western Conference Quarterfinals, which Vancouver won in a four-game sweep. Vancouver won two of the three games in this year's regular season series.

The Canucks defeated the Blues in six games. Canucks captain Bo Horvat scored twice in game one, defeating the Blues 5–2. Although Blues forward Samuel Blais tied game two with seven seconds remaining, Horvat's second goal of the game at 5:55 of overtime gave the Canucks a 4–3 victory and a 2–0 series lead. In game three, Jake Allen made 39 saves and Brayden Schenn scored the overtime-game winning goal, defeating the Canucks 3–2. The Blues evened up the series in game four, with Ryan O'Reilly scoring twice in a 3–1 victory. Vancouver came back from a two-goal deficit in game five to defeat St. Louis 4–3 and take a 3–2 series lead. Tyler Motte scored twice in game six, sending the Canucks to the Second Round and handily defeating the Blues 6–2.

Second Round

Eastern Conference Second Round

(1) Philadelphia Flyers vs. (6) New York Islanders
This was the fifth playoff meeting between these two teams, with Philadelphia winning three of the four previous series. They last met in the 1987 Patrick Division Finals, which Philadelphia won in seven games. New York won all three games in this year's regular season series.

The Islanders upset the Flyers in seven games after giving up a 3–1 series lead. Semyon Varlamov posted his second consecutive shutout in game one, stopping all 29 shots for 4–0 Islanders victory. The Flyers prevented a three-goal comeback from the Islanders in game two with Philippe Myers' goal at 2:41 of overtime to defeat New York 4–3. Varlamov made 26 saves for the Islanders in game three, emerging victorious 3–1. In game four, Brock Nelson scored twice and Thomas Greiss made 36 saves for the Islanders in a 3–2 victory. Although the Flyers dropped a 3–1 lead in the third period of game five, they forced a sixth game on Scott Laughton's overtime goal to win 4–3. In game six, the Flyers held a back-and-forth affair reaching the second overtime where Ivan Provorov's goal at 15:03 kept Philadelphia's season alive, defeating New York 5–4. In game seven, Brock Nelson had a goal and two assists and Greiss stopped all sixteen shots he faced in a 4–0 shutout to send the Islanders to the Eastern Conference Final for the first time in 27 years.

(2) Tampa Bay Lightning vs. (4) Boston Bruins
This was the third playoff series between these two teams with both teams splitting the two previous series. They last met in the 2018 Eastern Conference second round, which Tampa Bay won in five games. Tampa Bay won the round-robin game between these two teams earlier in this year's playoffs 3–2. Tampa Bay won three of four games in this year's regular season series.

The Lightning defeated the Bruins in five games. Jaroslav Halak made 35 saves for the Bruins in game one who defeated the Lightning 3–2. In game two, Ondrej Palat scored the overtime-winning goal for Tampa Bay, tying the series 1–1 in a 4–3. victory. The Lightning had an offensive outburst in game three, scoring seven goals against Boston in a 7–1 rout. Palat scored twice for the Lightning in game four, defeating the Bruins 3–1 and taking a 3–1 series lead. In game five, Victor Hedman ended the series 14:10 into double-overtime for the Lightning, defeating the Bruins 3–2 and advancing to the Eastern Conference Final.

Western Conference Second Round

(1) Vegas Golden Knights vs. (5) Vancouver Canucks
This was the first playoff meeting between these two teams. These two teams split their two-game regular season series.

The Golden Knights defeated the Canucks in seven games after giving up a 3–1 series lead. In game one, Robin Lehner stopped all 26 shots he faced as the Golden Knights defeated the Canucks 5–0. Jacob Markstrom made 38 saves for the Canucks in game two, tying the series 1–1 and defeating the Golden Knights 5–2. Lehner posted his second shutout of the series, stopping all 31 shots in game three, defeating the Canucks 3–0. Max Pacioretty scored twice and provided an assist for the Golden Knights in game four, who defeated the Canucks 5–3 to take a 3–1 series lead. In game five, rookie goaltender Thatcher Demko made 42 saves for the Canucks, defeating the Golden Knights 2–1 to force a sixth game. Demko shut out the Golden Knights in game six, stopping all 48 shots he faced in a 4–0 victory. In game seven, the Golden Knights limited the Canucks' shots to fourteen throughout three periods, shutting out Vancouver 3–0 and advancing to the Western Conference Final.

(2) Colorado Avalanche vs. (3) Dallas Stars
This was the fifth playoff series between these two teams, with both teams splitting the four previous series. They last met in the 2006 Western Conference Quarterfinals, which Colorado won in five games. Colorado won the round-robin game between these two teams earlier in this year's playoffs 4–0. Dallas won all four games in this year's regular season series.

The Stars defeated the Avalanche in seven games after giving up a 3–1 series lead. In game one, Alexander Radulov scored twice, also providing an assist, in a 5–3 victory for the Stars. After falling behind 2–0 in game two, the Stars rallied past the Avalanche, scoring four goals in the second period and defeating Colorado 5–2. In game three, the Avalanche spoiled a two-goal comeback by the Stars, scoring three straight in the third period with 7:58 remaining to defeat Dallas 6–4. The Stars held off a late rally by the Avalanche in game four, keeping the score at 5–4 and taking a 3–1 series lead with the victory. In game five, the Avalanche had a first period offensive outburst, scoring five goals, including four within a span of 2:36 (one second from equalling the league record for the fastest four goals by one team in a game in playoff history) to win 6–3. Nathan MacKinnon extended his point streak to fourteen games, scoring a goal and recording an assist in game six to defeat the Stars 4–1 and force a seventh game. In game seven, the two teams battled it throughout three periods scoring four against each other, but 7:24 into overtime Joel Kiviranta's hat trick goal gave the Stars the victory, advancing to the Western Conference Final with a 5–4 victory.

Conference Finals

Eastern Conference Final

(2) Tampa Bay Lightning vs. (6) New York Islanders
This was the third playoff meeting between these two teams with Tampa Bay winning both previous series. They last met in the 2016 Eastern Conference second round, which Tampa Bay won in five games. This was Tampa Bay's sixth Conference Finals appearance. They last went to the Conference Finals in 2018, which they lost to the Washington Capitals in seven games. This was New York's fifth appearance in the Conference Finals. They last went to the Conference Finals in 1993, which they lost against the Montreal Canadiens in five games. New York won two of the three games in this year's regular season series.

The Lightning defeated the Islanders in six games. In game one, Lightning forwards Brayden Point and Nikita Kucherov both had five points in an 8–2 rout: Point had two goals and three assists and Kucherov scored a goal and assisted four times. Kucherov scored the game-winning goal with nine seconds remaining in game two to give the Lightning a 2–1 victory. After giving up a 3–1 lead in game three, Brock Nelson's goal with 3:25 left put the Islanders ahead, emerging victorious 5–3. In game four, three Lightning players had two points and goalie Andrei Vasilevskiy provided an assist in Tampa Bay's 4–1 victory to take a 3–1 series lead. In game five, Islanders forward Jordan Eberle scored at 12:30 of double overtime to win the game 2–1 and extend the series to a sixth game. Anthony Cirelli's goal at 13:18 of the first overtime period in game six gave the Lightning a 2–1 victory sending Tampa Bay to the Stanley Cup Finals for the first time since 2015.

Western Conference Final

(1) Vegas Golden Knights vs. (3) Dallas Stars

This was the first playoff series between these two teams. Vegas won their round-robin game between these two teams earlier in this year's playoffs 5–3. This was Vegas' second appearance in the Conference Finals. Their only previous Conference Finals was in 2018, which they won against the Winnipeg Jets in five games. This was Dallas's seventh Conference Finals appearance. They last went to the Conference Finals in 2008, which they lost to the Detroit Red Wings in six games. These teams split their two games in this year's regular season series.

The Stars defeated the Golden Knights in five games. Anton Khudobin made 25 saves and John Klingberg scored the only goal of game one for the Stars, shutting out Vegas 1–0. Robin Lehner posted his own shutout in game two, stopping all 24 shots in the Golden Knights' 3–0 victory. In game three, Alexander Radulov gave the Stars a 2–1 series lead after his goal 31 seconds into overtime ensured Dallas a 3–2 victory. Khudobin made 32 saves in game four, leading the Stars to a 2–1 win. In game five, the Stars came back from a 2–0 deficit in the third period to force overtime and at 3:36 of the first overtime, Denis Gurianov scored to send the Stars to the Stanley Cup Finals for the first time in 20 years with a 3–2 victory.

Stanley Cup Finals

This was the first playoff meeting between these two teams. Tampa Bay made their third Finals appearance. They last went to the Finals in 2015, which they lost to the Chicago Blackhawks in six games. Dallas made their fifth appearance in the Finals. They last went to the Finals in 2000, which they lost to the New Jersey Devils in six games. Dallas won both games in this year's regular season series.

Player statistics

Skaters
These are the top ten skaters based on points, following the conclusion of the playoffs.

Goaltenders
This is a combined table of the top five goaltenders based on goals against average and the top five goaltenders based on save percentage, with at least 420 minutes played. The table is sorted by GAA, and the criteria for inclusion are bolded.

Activism

On August 26, 2020, various professional athletes in the U.S began to go on strike from their respective sports contests in response to the August 23 police shooting of Jacob Blake in Kenosha, Wisconsin, and the protests which followed. These strikes began with the Milwaukee Bucks of the National Basketball Association (NBA). Other players in the NBA, Major League Baseball, Major League Soccer and Women's National Basketball Association soon followed suit and also decided not to play their August 26 games.

When these cancellations south of the border began, NHL players were still isolated in the Edmonton and Toronto bubbles, with game two of the Islanders–Flyers series already in progress when the Bucks first announced their decision to not play. The NHL then continued to play the remaining August 26 games, as NHL players did not take a strong stand for the rest of the day. After pressure brought by the postponement of games by the other leagues, and discussions by players of the Hockey Diversity Alliance such as Evander Kane and Mathew Dumba, the NHLPA announced that they would not play their games on August 27 and August 28. The affected games involved all eight teams remaining: game three between the Flyers and Islanders, game three between the Golden Knights and Canucks, game four between the Lightning and Bruins, and game four between the Avalanche and Stars. The NHL fully supported their decision to postpone the games. On September 1, Dallas Stars president Brad Alberts reported that his team had lost some corporate and personal season ticket holders as a result of the protest.

Television
This marked the sixth postseason under Rogers Media's 12-year contract for Canadian television rights to the NHL. All games were exclusively broadcast by Sportsnet and CBC under the Hockey Night in Canada brand, and streamed on Sportsnet Now, CBCSports.ca (for games televised by CBC), or the subscription service Rogers NHL Live.

This also marked the ninth postseason under NBC Sports' current 10-year contract for American rights. All national coverage of games were aired on either NBCSN, the NBC broadcast network, CNBC, NHL Network, or USA Network. During the round-robins, Qualifying Round, and First Round, excluding games exclusively broadcast on NBC, the regional rightsholders of each participating U.S. team produced local telecasts of their respective games.

Only technical staff such as cameramen and producers were present inside the "bubble". A clean host feed was then sent to media partners to add commentary and surrounding coverage, and interviews with players had to be conducted via videoconferencing. Commentators called the games remotely off of monitors from either their respective studios or from their home arena press boxes. This same arrangement was also done for the radio networks of every team.

While it was initially stated that all commentators would broadcast remotely, the league eventually allowed a handful of both Sportsnet and NBC commentators and reporters into the hubs to call select games. Chris Cuthbert, who jumped from TSN to Sportsnet during the break in June, and Louie DeBrusk were on-site in Edmonton; and Jim Hughson and Craig Simpson were on-site in Toronto during the Qualifying, First, and Second Rounds; they later moved to the Edmonton hub. For NBC, John Forslund, Mike Milbury, and Brian Boucher were initially sent to Toronto; and Pierre McGuire to Edmonton. Milbury was later removed from commentary for the remainder of NBC Sports' coverage after making insensitive comments following the fifth game of the Islanders–Capitals First Round series. Gord Miller later joined Forslund, Milbury, and Boucher at the Toronto bubble and alternated with Forslund on a handful of broadcasts. Most of NBC's other commentators began working games remotely from NBC Sports' studios in Stamford, Connecticut, with NBC planning for "the majority of calls" to eventually be conducted on-site, including the last two rounds of the playoffs in Edmonton. Kenny Albert, who worked for both NBC and the New York Rangers radio broadcasts, traveled to the Edmonton bubble after the Rangers were eliminated in the Qualifying Round. Albert called play-by-play of every game of the Western Conference Second Round and the first three games of the Western Conference Finals before leaving the Edmonton bubble to join the NFL on Fox broadcast team. Forslund, Boucher, and Eddie Olczyk later flew to the Edmonton bubble to call the Conference Finals. In the case of NBC lead play-by-play commentator Mike "Doc" Emrick, he was working games from his home studio in Metro Detroit because he is a cancer survivor over the age of 70, and therefore at increased risk of severe illness from COVID-19.

Additional cameras were used to provide new angles not usually possible when a crowd is present, and de-emphasize views of the arenas' stands. The telecasts used simulated crowd noise provided by Electronic Arts, combined with recordings of team-specific chants by season ticketholders of participating teams (the latter of which will also be played in-arena). All games carried a five second broadcast delay in order to censor offensive language.

NBC staff were working on the Toronto broadcasts, while Sportsnet staff did the same with the Edmonton broadcasts. Steve Simmons of the Toronto Sun reported that Canadian freelance broadcast workers were upset that NBC personnel were being allowed into Canada to work in Toronto instead of them. The NHL's EVP of communications Gary Meagher stated that splitting production in this manner had been intended "from the onset". Premier of Ontario Doug Ford admitted that plans of NBC's involvement were not part of the early negotiations with the league.

Viewership
Average U.S. viewership of the playoff rounds were down by 28% compared to 2019, the lowest to-date over the course of NBC's current broadcast rights contract. Amid expanded competition due to the difference in scheduling, game one of the Stanley Cup Finals was seen by only 2.12 million viewers; with an average of 2.15 million across the entire series, it was the least-watched Stanley Cup Finals since 2007, and down 61% over 2019. Airing opposite a Monday Night Football contest between the Kansas City Chiefs and Baltimore Ravens, Game six was seen by 2.88 million viewers, the least-watched series-clinching game since at least 2000.

References

External links
 Stanley Cup playoffs

Stanley Cup playoffs
play
Stanley Cup playoffs
Ice hockey competitions in Edmonton
Ice hockey competitions in Toronto
Stanley Cup
Stanley Cup